Pichit Sitbangprachan; born Supap Hanwichachai (สุภาพ หาญวิชาชัย); 15 January 1966) is a former professional boxer from Thailand. He is one of just fifteen world boxing champions to retire without a loss. He is the older brother of Pichit Chor Siriwat, a former WBA Junior-flyweight champion.

Career history 
Sitbangprachan turned professional in 1988. In 1992 he captured the IBF flyweight title with a KO win over champion Rodolfo Blanco at Imperial World Samrong, Samut Prakan province. When he won the world title he was considered a very famous and popular boxer, because during that time Thailand does not have any boxers reigning world champions. He defended the belt five times, including Arthur Johnson at Surat Thani Province Stadium, Surat Thani province, southern Thailand and a split decision win over Jose Luis Zepeda in May 1994 in Ratchaburi province. After the bout, Zepada made a request to the IBF asking for a rematch, because Zepada did not accept the decision. IBF has ordered them to rematch. But Sitbangprachan finally retired on November 25 of the same year by holding a press conference at the Parliament House. Sitbangprachan retiring undefeated at 24-0.

Comeback
Sitbangprachan returned to boxing in 1996 and fought and won one bout. He then returned in 2000 and fought and won two bouts before retiring for good. He is one of a select group of boxing world champions who were never defeated in their professional career.

Retirement
After retirement he traveled to a boxing trainer at the Ioka Boxing Gym in Osaka, Japan.

Professional boxing record

Muay Thai record

|- style="background:#cfc;"
| 1990-09- || Win ||align=left| Rerkchai Singkongpan || Lumpinee Stadium ||  Bangkok, Thailand  || KO || 1 || 

|- style="background:#cfc;"
| 1990-09- || Win ||align=left| Pairot Wor.Wolapon || Lumpinee Stadium ||  Bangkok, Thailand  || KO || 3 || 

|- style="background:#cfc;"
| 1990-08-18 || Win ||align=left| Dawden Sor.Sakkasem || Lumpinee Stadium ||  Bangkok, Thailand  || KO (Punches)|| 1 || 

|- style="background:#cfc;"
| 1990-07- || Win ||align=left| Kahewa Chor.Rachachat || Lumpinee Stadium ||  Bangkok, Thailand  || KO || 2 || 

|- style="background:#fbb;"
| 1990-05-21 || Loss ||align=left| Pairot Wor.Wolapon || Lumpinee Stadium ||  Bangkok, Thailand  || Decision || 5 || 3:00

|- style="background:#fbb;"
| 1990-01-05 || Loss ||align=left| Makhamlek Sit Khunwaen ||  Lumpinee Stadium ||  Bangkok, Thailand  || Decision || 5 || 3:00

|- style="background:#fbb;"
| 1989-09-19 || Loss ||align=left| Thanongchai Charoenmuang ||  Lumpinee Stadium ||  Bangkok, Thailand  || Decision || 5 || 3:00

|- style="background:#fbb;"
| 1989-07-25 || Loss ||align=left| Paruhatnoi Sitchunthong ||  Lumpinee Stadium ||  Bangkok, Thailand  || Decision || 5 || 3:00

|- style="background:#cfc;"
| 1989-06-13 || Win ||align=left| Chuchod Lukprabat || Lumpinee Stadium ||  Bangkok, Thailand  || TKO || 1|| 

|- style="background:#fbb;"
| 1989-03-28 || Loss ||align=left| Kuekrit Sor.Nayaiam ||  Lumpinee Stadium ||  Bangkok, Thailand  || Decision || 5 || 3:00

|- style="background:#cfc;"
| 1988-12- || Win ||align=left| Songchainoi Por.Somjit Air || Omnoi Stadium ||  Samut Sakhon, Thailand  || TKO || 2|| 

|- style="background:#cfc;"
| 1988-12-02 || Win ||align=left| Samranthong Chuchokchai ||  Lumpinee Stadium ||  Bangkok, Thailand  || KO || 2|| 

|- style="background:#fbb;"
| 1988-11-03 || Loss ||align=left| Makhamlek Sit Khunwaen ||  Rajadamnern Stadium ||  Bangkok, Thailand  || Decision || 5 || 3:00

|- style="background:#fbb;"
| 1988-05-03 || Loss ||align=left| Pongsiri Por Ruamrudee ||   Lumpinee Stadium ||  Bangkok, Thailand  || Decision || 5 || 3:00

|- style="background:#cfc;"
| 1988-01-28 || Win ||align=left| Petchnamkhang Chatphol191 ||Rajadamnern Stadium ||  Bangkok, Thailand  || KO (Punch) || 2|| 

|- style="background:#cfc;"
| 1987-12-25 || Win ||align=left| Petchdam Sitsei ||Rajadamnern Stadium ||  Bangkok, Thailand  || KO (Punch) || 1|| 

|-
| colspan=9 | Legend:

References

External links 
 

1966 births
Pichit Sitbangprachan
Flyweight boxers
International Boxing Federation champions
Living people
World flyweight boxing champions
World boxing champions
Undefeated world boxing champions
Pichit Sitbangprachan
Pichit Sitbangprachan
Boxing trainers
Southpaw boxers
Thai expatriate sportspeople in Japan